Rzeczniów  is a village in Lipsko County, Masovian Voivodeship, in east-central Poland. It is the seat of the gmina (administrative district) called Gmina Rzeczniów.

References

Villages in Lipsko County